Carpe Tenebrum (incorrectly, "Seize the Darkness" in Latin) was a black metal solo project of the former Dimmu Borgir and Covenant guitarist Jamie Stinson, better known as Astennu. Stian Arnesen (Nagash) was also involved with the project. Very little has been heard of the project since the release of the third album, Dreaded Chaotic Reign, in 2002.

Members
 Jamie "Astennu" Stinson - guitars, bass, keyboards, drum machine programming, vocals on Dreaded Chaotic Reign)
 Stian "Nagash" Arnesen - vocals on the first two albums

Discography
 Majestic Nothingness LP (1997, Head Not Found)
 Mirrored Hate Painting LP (1999, Hammerheart Records)
 Dreaded Chaotic Reign LP (2002, Hammerheart Records)

References

External links
 Official Carpe Tenebrum Myspace
 Carpe Tenebrum biography @ MusicMight

 

Norwegian black metal musical groups
Norwegian symphonic black metal musical groups
Musical groups established in 1997
1997 establishments in Norway
Musical groups from Oslo